Baghban Kola may refer to:
 Baghban Kola, Amol
 Baghban Kola, Nur
 Baghban Kola, Baladeh, Nur County